Salt Lake is a lake in the north part of New Zealand's Northland Region, just off the 1F Far North Road.

See also
List of lakes in New Zealand

References

Lakes of the Northland Region
Far North District